Pengjiazhuang Hui Ethnic Township (Xiao'erjing: پْعکِاجُوْا خُوِذُو سِیْا) is a township-level division of Xinle City, Shijiazhuang, Hebei, China.

See also
 List of township-level divisions of Hebei

References

Township-level divisions of Hebei
Ethnic townships of the People's Republic of China
Xinle, Hebei